Kosmos Radio or Kosmos 93.6 & 107.0, is a public radio channel of Greece's public broadcaster, ERT, the most popular among its radio stations. The program consists of world music, jazz, folk, reggae, latin idioms, hip hop, afro and alternative rock and pop. The actual director for Kosmos is Leonidas Antonopoulos.

Hellenic Radio
Radio stations established in 2001